Galaxite, also known as 'mangan-spinel' is an isometric mineral belonging to the spinel group of oxides with the ideal chemical formula .

Galaxite is the manganese (Mn) rich endmember of the aluminium (Al) series of the spinel group. Divalent iron (Fe) and magnesium (Mg) readily substitute for the manganese in the crystal structure. Trivalent iron may also substitute for the aluminium.

Galaxite generally occurs as small granular aggregates with a red-brownish tone. It has a vitreous luster and leaves a brownish-red streak. It is rated 7.5 on the Mohs Scale.

It was first described in 1932 for an occurrence at Bald Knob, Alleghany County, North Carolina near its namesakes, the town of Galax, Virginia, named after the plant galax or wandflower which grows in the area.

It occurs in carbonate-rich metamorphosed manganese ore deposits. It occurs associated with alleghanyite, rhodonite, sonolite, spessartine, tephroite, kutnohorite, manganhumite, jacobsite, kellyite and alabandite in the Bald Knob area. Associated minerals include katoptrite, magnetite, manganostibite, magnussonite, tephroite, manganhumite and manganosite in the  Brattfors mine area of Nordmark, Värmland, Sweden.

It is sometimes used as a gemstone.

References

 IMA Database - Galaxite

Manganese(II) minerals
Iron(II,III) minerals
Magnesium minerals
Aluminium minerals
Spinel gemstones
Cubic minerals
Minerals in space group 227
Oxide minerals